Denin is a town in Chitral district of Pakistan.

See also
Drosh

Chitral District
Populated places in Chitral District